The Hindu rate of growth is a term coined by Indian economist Raj Krishna in 1978 and used by advocates of liberalisation referring to the annual growth rate of the economy of India before the economic reforms of 1991, which averaged at 4% from 1950s to 1980s. The Indian economy of this period is characterised as Dirigism. The usage of the term has been criticized by modern neoliberal economists as they believe that the cause of the low growth rate was the failed dirigist model and economic mismanagement.

India was a leader in the non-aligned movement and sought to maintain a neutral stance during the Cold War. As a result, it did not receive the same level of aid from the US and other Western countries as countries that were more closely aligned with the West.

The economy of India accelerated and has grown at a rate of around 3–9% since economic liberalisation began in the 1990s with the exception of 2020. Recent research has shown that India's growth rate had begun to attain higher growth since Indira Gandhi's time in 1980s due to economic reforms, with average growth rate of 5.8% in 1981 to 1991. GDP growth rate has however slowed since 2016. In March 2023, Raghuram Rajan said that the growth rate in recent times was dangerously close to India's old Hindu rate of growth.

The word "Hindu" in the term was used by some early economists like Vikas Mishra to imply that the Hindu outlook of fatalism and contentedness was responsible for the slow growth. Later liberal economists reject this connection and instead attribute the rate to the Indian government's protectionist and interventionist policies, rather than to a specific religion or to the attitude of some of the adherents of a particular religion. Accordingly, some neoliberal writers instead use the term "Nehruvian rate of growth".

Term
The first time Hinduism was equated with economic growth was in February 1973, by B.P.R. Vithal, who wrote under a pseudonym, Najin Yanupi about India’s per capita growth rates: “This is the range within which alone the Hindu view of life will hold." The term was formally coined by Indian economist Raj Krishna. It suggests that the low growth rate of India, a country with mostly Hindu population was in a sharp contrast to high growth rates in other Asian countries, especially the East Asian Tigers, which were also newly independent. This meaning of the term, popularised by Robert McNamara, was used disparagingly and has connotations that refer to the supposed Hindu outlook of fatalism and contentedness.

Economic system in India after Independence 
India has never been a socialist country in the strict sense of the term. After independence in 1947, India adopted a mixed economy model, with elements of both socialism and capitalism. It was seen as a way to achieve rapid industrialization and economic development, and to reduce the country's dependence on foreign capital and imports. This approach, known as the "dirgitse model," involved state control of key industries, such as banking, insurance, and heavy industry, and the promotion of import substitution and self-reliance.

India abandoned its dirgitse model of economic development in the 1990s and adopted a more market-oriented approach, known as neoliberalism. The shift to neoliberalism in India was influenced by broader changes in the global economy, such as the dissolution of the Soviet Union and the emergence of globalisation as well as a condition of the IMF loan during 1991 Balance of Payments crisis, India was required to undertake economic reforms, including liberalization, deregulation, and privatization.

Comparison
In 1947, the average annual income in India was $439, compared with $619 for China, $770 for South Korea, and $936 for Taiwan. By 1999, the numbers were $1,818; $3,259; $13,317; and $15,720.

India's growth rate was low by standards of developing countries. At the same time, Pakistan grew by 5%, Indonesia by 6%, Thailand by 7%, Taiwan by 8% and South Korea by 9%.

The comparison with South Korea was stark:
In 1947, South Korean per capita income was less than 2 times bigger than India's.
By 1960, South Korean per capita income was 4 times larger than India's
By 1990, South Korean per capita income was 20 times larger.
South Korea received much higher U.S aid and foreign investment when compared to India. South Korea, similar to India was also forced to adopt IMF and World Bank imposed reforms during the 1997 Asian Financial crisis.

China kept a significant part of its economy under state control even after reform and opening up despite receiving criticism from liberal institutions. However, despite such policies Chinese economy grew at a much higher pace than India's, overtaking Japan in 2010.

Pakistan meanwhile, despite implementing liberal reforms under Pervez Musharraf experienced lower economic growth compared to India.

Criticism 

Noted neoliberal politician and journalist Arun Shourie claimed that the "Hindu rate of growth" was a result of socialist policies implemented by governments:

According to economist Sanjeev Sanyal, the term was an attempt to suggest that "it was not Nehruvian economic policies that had failed India, it was India’s cultural moorings that had failed Nehru." He linked it with what he considered to be the ideological domination of the left, backed by the socialist regime, in post-Independence India. However, Raj Krishna, who coined the term, was known as a right winger and opposed to Congress government. After the Indira Gandhi government was ousted in 1977, he became a member of the Planning Commission under the Janata Party government.

The term is also seen by some as oversimplifying the complex economic, political, and social factors that contribute to a country's rate of growth. Economic growth is influenced by a wide range of factors such as education, infrastructure, political stability, and access to capital, among others. It also neglects the progress in self-reliance that India had attained in metallurgical, mechanical, chemical, power and transport sectors.

See also 
 Economic history of India
 Economic liberalisation in India
 Licence Raj
 Poverty in India
 The World Economy: Historical Statistics

References

External links 
 The power of ideas, The Hindu Business Line, June 10, 2004
 Hindu rate of growth  – An explanation by Meghnad Desai
 The World Economy: A Millennial Perspective

Economic history of India (1947–present)
Economic growth